Fluitsma & Van Tijn is a Dutch writing duo made up of Jochem Fluitsma (born in Amsterdam on 1 June 1958) and Eric van Tijn (born in Amsterdam on 2 November 1956)

They won the Golden Harp Dutch music award in 1997.

References

External links
Eric van Tijn and Jochem Fluitsma page on Discogs

Dutch record producers
Dutch songwriters
1950s births
Living people
Writers from Amsterdam